Earl of Clare was a title of British nobility created three times: once each in the peerages of England, Great Britain and Ireland.
	
The title derives from Clare, Suffolk, where a prominent Anglo-Norman family was seated since the Norman Conquest, and from which their English surname sprang from possession of the Honour of Clare. The Norman family who took the name 'de Clare' became associated with the peerage as they held, at differing times, three earldoms (Gloucester, Pembroke and Hertford).

Honour of Clare 
The death of the young Gilbert de Clare, Earl of Gloucester, at the Battle of Bannockburn (1314) entailed the break-up of the Honour of Clare, as he and his young wife were childless and the lands were distributed among three co-heiresses. His death marked the end of the great de Clare family. The family lands were worth as much as £6,000, second only to those of the Earl of Lancaster among the nobility of the realm.

The lands went into royal wardship while the matter of inheritance was settled. By the entail of 1290, the lands could only be inherited by direct descendants of the late earl's father. The late earl's sisters, Eleanor, Margaret (now widowed after the death of Piers Gaveston) and Elizabeth were by 1317 all married to favourites of Edward II: Hugh Despenser the Younger, Hugh de Audley and Roger d'Amory, respectively. The three were granted equal parts of the English possessions, but Despenser received the entire lordship of Glamorgan in Wales, politically the most important of the de Clare lands.

Possible medieval earls 
The "Earl of Clare" was probably not a medieval title. Some contemporary sources called them "Earls of Clare", but many modern historians treat this as if it were a "styled" (self-assumed) title. There was no standardised method of reference to earls in the late eleventh and twelfth centuries, and the Clares were one of a handful referred to as earls in this period without a county mentioned. For example, Gerald of Wales recounts an incident relating to the Earl of Clare, possibly referring to William Fitz Robert, 2nd Earl of Gloucester. Such references led some older historians to assume the Earls of Gloucester and Hertford also carried the title Earls of Clare. The title, for instance, is given in the original Dictionary of National Biography. The confusion probably stems from misinterpretation of references, such as that of "Earl Gilbert de Clare", in which Clare was taken as a title rather than a surname. One view is there was no such title in existence, and that the first creation of the title Earl of Clare dates to 1624. However, John Burke in 1831 states that prior to the 1624 creation, Robert Rich, Earl of Warwick, was to be created Earl of Clare, but that it was refused by the crown lawyers, "on a solemn declaration, that it was a title peculiar to the royal blood and not to be conferred upon a subject."

Earl of Clare, first creation (1624)

The title of Earl of Clare was formally created by letters patent in the peerage of England on 2 November 1624 for John Holles. He was first elevated to the peerage as Baron Houghton of Houghton by King James I on 9 July 1616. According to Burke, he was ennobled thanks to the influence of the George Villiers, Viscount Villiers, future Duke of Buckingham, to whom Holles paid £10,000. He was created Earl of Clare following an additional payment of £5,000.

The fourth earl married Lady Margaret Cavendish, third daughter and co-heir of Henry Cavendish, 2nd Duke of Newcastle, and he inherited the majority of the Duke's estates upon his death in 1691. On 14 May 1694, he was created Marquess of Clare and Duke of Newcastle-upon-Tyne.

The fourth earl's only child, Lady Henrietta Cavendish Holles, married Edward Harley, 2nd Earl of Oxford and Earl Mortimer. Their daughter, Lady Margaret Cavendish Harley, who married William Bentinck, 2nd Duke of Portland.

The title became extinct upon the death the fourth earl in 1711.

John Holles, 1st Earl of Clare (1564–1637)
John Holles, 2nd Earl of Clare (1595–1666)
Gilbert Holles, 3rd Earl of Clare (1633–1689)
John Holles, 4th Earl of Clare (1662–1711), created Marquess of Clare and Duke of Newcastle-upon-Tyne in 1694

Earl of Clare, second creation (1714)

The next creation of the Earl of Clare was in the Peerage of Great Britain for Thomas Pelham, nephew and heir of the last earl of the first creation. He had been adopted by his uncle and assumed the arms and surname of Holles. He was a significant statesman during the early Georgian era, and he served as the First Lord of the Treasury, among other roles.

He was created Viscount Pelham of Houghton and Earl of Clare on 26 October 1714.

Marquess of Clare (1715) 
The following year, on 2 August 1715, he was further created Marquess of Clare and Duke of Newcastle, with remainder to his brother the Rt. Hon. Henry Pelham. In 1756, he was created Duke of Newcastle Under Lyne with remainder to his nephew, Henry Fiennes-Clinton, 9th Earl of Lincoln. His brother predeceased him, leaving no male heirs, and at his death in 1768, the titles of Earl of Clare and Marquess of Clare again became extinct, but he was succeeded by his nephew as Duke of Newcastle Under Lyne.

Thomas Pelham-Holles, Earl of Clare (1693–1768), created Marquess of Clare and Duke of Newcastle in 1715

Earls of Clare, third creation (1795)
The title was again created, in the peerage of Ireland, in 1795 for John FitzGibbon, 1st Viscount FitzGibbon, the Lord Chancellor of Ireland. He had already been created Baron FitzGibbon, of Lower Connello in the County of Limerick, in 1789, and Viscount FitzGibbon, of Limerick in the County of Limerick, in 1793. These titles were also in the peerage of Ireland. In 1799 he was made Baron FitzGibbon, of Sidbury in the County of Devon, in the peerage of Great Britain. He was succeeded by his eldest son, the second Earl. He served as Governor of Bombay from 1830 to 1834. He died childless and was succeeded by his younger brother, the third earl. He represented County Limerick in the House of Commons and served as Lord Lieutenant of County Limerick. Lord Clare's only son, John Charles Henry FitzGibbon, styled Viscount FitzGibbon, was killed in action during the Battle of Balaclava where he charged with the 8th King's Royal Irish Hussars. On Lord Clare's death in 1864 the peerages became extinct.

John FitzGibbon, 1st Earl of Clare (1748–1802)
John FitzGibbon, 2nd Earl of Clare (1792–1851)
Richard Hobart FitzGibbon, 3rd Earl of Clare (1793–1864)

See also
Viscount Clare
Earl of Clarence
de Clare

References

Extinct earldoms in the Peerage of Ireland
Extinct earldoms in the Peerage of Great Britain
Noble titles created in 1624
Noble titles created in 1714
Noble titles created in 1795